St. James Memorial Church of Eatontown is a historic church at 69 Broad Street in Eatontown, Monmouth County, New Jersey, United States.

It was built in 1866 and added to the National Register of Historic Places in 1978.

References

External links
 

Episcopal church buildings in New Jersey
Churches on the National Register of Historic Places in New Jersey
Gothic Revival church buildings in New Jersey
Churches completed in 1866
Religious organizations established in 1866
Churches in Monmouth County, New Jersey
National Register of Historic Places in Monmouth County, New Jersey
New Jersey Register of Historic Places
Eatontown, New Jersey